The 1976–77 Albanian National Championship was the 38th season of the Albanian National Championship, the top professional league for association football clubs, since its establishment in 1930.

Overview
It was contested by 12 teams, and Dinamo Tirana won the championship.

First phase

League table

Results

Final phase

Championship round

Results

Relegation round

Note: '17 Nëntori' is Tirana, 'Lokomotiva Durrës' is Teuta, 'Labinoti' is Elbasani, 'Traktori' is Lushnja

Results

References
Albania - List of final tables (RSSSF)

Kategoria Superiore seasons
1
Albania